Potok pri Komendi is a small settlement next to Komenda in the Upper Carniola region of Slovenia.

Name
The name of the settlement was changed from Potok to Potok pri Komendi in 1955.

References

External links

Potok pri Komendi on Geopedia

Populated places in the Municipality of Komenda